England competed at the 1978 Commonwealth Games in Edmonton, Alberta, Canada, 3 to 12 August 1978. 

England finished second in the medal table.

Medal table (top three)

The athletes that competed are listed below.

Athletics

Badminton

Bowls

Boxing

Cycling

Diving

Gymnastics

Shooting

Swimming

Weightlifting

Wrestling

References

1978
Nations at the 1978 Commonwealth Games
Commonwealth Games